James Bettauer (born March 19, 1991) is a Canadian-German professional ice hockey player who currently plays for the Ravensburg Towerstars in the German DEL2. Bettauer was previously with the Sheffield Steelers of the Elite Ice Hockey League (EIHL).

Playing career
Bettauer moved to Hamburg Freezers in 2012, after playing junior hockey in the Western Hockey League for Medicine Hat Tigers and Prince Albert Raiders. Bettauer scored 10 points in his first season with the Freezers, helping them to a 5th place finish and a place in the play-offs.

After completing his second season with the Freezers, Bettauer left as a free agent and signed a one-year contract with DEL rivals the Augsburger Panther on April 15, 2014. In March 2015, he had his contract renewed for the 2015–16 season. In March 2016, he was signed by another DEL team, the Straubing Tigers.

In July 2019, Bettauer agreed to a move to the UK EIHL where he signed with the Sheffield Steelers on a two-year deal, while also accepting a two-year tenured MBA package at the University of Sheffield.

Despite initially agreeing to return to Sheffield for a second season, the indefinite suspension of the 2020-21 Elite League season due to ongoing coronavirus restrictions saw Bettauer instead sign for German DEL2 side Ravensburg Towerstars.

Personal life 
His father comes from Berlin, Germany.

Career statistics

References

External links

1991 births
Living people
Augsburger Panther players
Canadian ice hockey defencemen
Chilliwack Bruins players
Coquitlam Express players
Hamburg Freezers players
Krefeld Pinguine players
Medicine Hat Tigers players
Penticton Vees players
Prince Albert Raiders players
Ravensburg Towerstars players
Sheffield Steelers players
Sportspeople from Burnaby
Straubing Tigers players